is a Japanese cable and satellite television channel operated by Turner Japan, a division of the Warner Bros. Discovery Asia-Pacific subsidiary of Warner Bros. Discovery. The channel is aimed at children, and mostly airs animated television series. As a Japanese version of the eponymous television channel in the United States, Cartoon Network broadcasts original series from its U.S. counterpart, as well as several Japanese animated series and films, and other non-Japanese programs.

On October 1, 2011, Cartoon Network in Japan, along with other versions of Cartoon Network operated by Turner Broadcasting System Asia Pacific, adopted its current branding. On April 1, 2017, the channel started using graphics from Cartoon Network USA's Dimensional brand package. On January 1, 2022, the channel started using graphics from Cartoon Network USA's Redraw Your World brand package. On March 1, 2022, the Cartoonito block was launched for daily mornings.

References

External links 

  

Cartoon Network
1997 establishments in Japan
Anime television
Anime and Cartoon television
Children's television channels in Japan
Japanese-language television stations
Television channels and stations established in 1997
Television stations in Japan
Warner Bros. Discovery Asia-Pacific
ja:カートゥーン ネットワーク